Neil David Lawrence is the DeepMind Professor of Machine Learning at the University of Cambridge in the Department of Computer Science and Technology, senior AI fellow at the Alan Turing Institute and visiting Professor at the University of Sheffield.

Education 
Lawrence obtained a Bachelors in Engineering degree in mechanical engineering at the University of Southampton, and a PhD from the University of Cambridge, with a thesis on variational inference in probabilistic models, supervised by Christopher Bishop.

Career and research
Lawrence spent a year at Microsoft Research before serving as a senior lecturer in machine learning and computational biology at the University of Sheffield for six years. From 2007 to 2010, Lawrence was research fellow at the University of Manchester's Department of Computer Science, returning to the University of Sheffield in 2010 as the collaborative chair of neuro and computer science.

In 2016, he was appointed director of machine learning at Amazon in Cambridge, where he collaborated with Ralf Herbrich, who became director of machine learning at Amazon in Berlin.

Upon his appointment as the inaugural DeepMind Professor Machine Learning at the University of Cambridge in September 2019, Ann Copestake stated Lawrence' addition would have a "transformative effect".

Lawrence' research interests are in machine learning, gaussian processes, and probabilistic models with applications in computational biology, personalised health and developing economies.

Ambassadorship 
Lawrence has advocated for data transparency and privacy, writing several prominent articles in The Guardian discussing issues ranging from the privacy implications of Machine Learning algorithms deployed on citizens, the current "state of the art" in the field, the importance of data-sharing and academic transparency, to the possibilities for Machine Learning to advance developing nations such as African nations. These efforts have been called "commendable" by Demis Hassabis.

More recently he has been solicited for his opinion on the absence of Machine Learning algorithms during the COVID-19 pandemic, to which he stated 

Lawrence hosts a podcast with Katherine Gorman called Talking Machines.

References 

Living people
British computer scientists
British engineers
Members of the University of Cambridge Computer Laboratory
Year of birth missing (living people)
Fellows of Queens' College, Cambridge